Lying and Stealing is a 2019 American crime drama film, directed by Matt Aselton from a screenplay by Aselton and Adam Nagata. It stars Theo James, Emily Ratajkowski, Fred Melamed, Ebon Moss-Bachrach, Isiah Whitlock Jr. and Evan Handler.

It was released on July 12, 2019, by Vertical Entertainment.

Plot
Ivan Warding is a thief who specializes in stealing art from the elite of Los Angeles.  He is obliged to a crime boss and wants to get out of the art heist business.  Elyse Tibaldi is an in-debt aspiring actress who is also a con-woman.  Together they plot one last heist and con that will set both free from their obligations.

Cast
 Theo James as Ivan Warding
 Emily Ratajkowski as Elyse Tibaldi
 Fred Melamed as Dimitri Maropakis
 Ebon Moss-Bachrach as Ray Warding
 Isiah Whitlock Jr. as Lyman Wilkers
 Evan Handler as Eric Maropakis
 John Gatins as Aton Eisenstadt
 Fernanda Andrade as Mary Bertring
 Bob Stephenson as Mr. Oklahoma
 Keith Powell as Mike Williams

Production
In November 2017, it was announced Theo James, Emily Ratajkowski, Fred Melamed, Ebon Moss-Bachrach, Isiah Whitlock Jr., Evan Handler and John Gatins joined the cast of the film, with Matt Aseleton directing from a screenplay he wrote alongside Adam Nagata.

Release
In January 2019, Vertical Entertainment and DirecTV Cinema acquired distribution rights to the film. It was released on July 12, 2019.

Critical response
On Metacritic, the film has a score of 50 out of 100, based on 6 critics, indicating "mixed or average reviews".

Dennis Harvey of Variety magazine wrote: "Yet even given its budgetary limits and second-tier cast, 'Lying and Stealing' manages to be a retro escapist pleasure — one whose cleverness might actually have been muffled by flashier surface assets."

References

External links
 

2019 films
American crime drama films
2019 crime drama films
Vertical Entertainment films
2010s English-language films
2010s American films